The Găldița is a right tributary of the river Galda in Romania. It flows into the Galda in Întregalde.

References

Rivers of Romania
Rivers of Alba County